Malabar Gopalan Sreekumar (born 25 May 1957), better known as M.G. Sreekumar is an Indian playback singer, composer, music producer, television presenter and film producer, who works predominantly in Malayalam cinema. He has sung more than 2000 songs in various Indian languages including Malayalam, Tamil, Telugu, Hindi, and Sanskrit. He owns a music company named KMG Musics and the Saregama School of Music in Thiruvananthapuram. Sreekumar has won several awards, including two National Film Awards, three Kerala State Film Awards and 5 Filmfare Awards South. He was also honoured with the Harivarasanam Award by the Government of Kerala in 2016. His career as a singer spans over 44 years.

Career
Sreekumar made his debut in the Malayalam movie Coolie (1983) Directed by Ashok Kumar. The Malayalam movie Chithram (1988) directed by Priyadarshan, starring Mohanlal, was the first where Sreekumar sang all the songs. He has sung more than 35,000 songs for films in Malayalam, Tamil, Hindi, Kannada and Telugu.

He worked as music director in Malayalam films such as Chathurangam (2002) and Thandavam (2002), Priyadarshan's Kanchivaram (2008), Mohanlal's Alexander the Great and Oru Naal Varum.

He anchored a TV show named SaReGaMa on Asianet and was a judge for the reality show Idea Star Singer. Now he is a judge in Top Singer on Flowers TV.

His appointment as chairman of Kerala Sangeeta Nataka Akademi by the LDF government of Kerala sparked controversy due to his close relations with its political rival BJP.

Personal life
Sreekumar was born on May 25, 1957 at Haripad, in Alappuzha district, Kerala as the younger son of music composer and harmonist Malabar Gopalan Nair and Harikatha exponent Kamalakshi Amma. He is the younger brother of popular music director M. G. Radhakrishnan and popular Carnatic musician Dr. K. Omanakkutty, who were both much elder to him. Sreekumar and Lekha, his future wife, first saw each other in 1988 at Thycaud Dharma Sastha Temple, Thiruvananthapuram, but they met each other only few days later after a concert. Gradually, they developed friendship and later began living together. Sreekumar and Lekha married on 14 January 2000 at the Mookambika Temple, Kollur.

Discography

Singer
Malayalam
 Coolie (1983)
 Poochakkoru Mookkuthi (1984)
 Onnanam Kunnil Oradi Kunnil (1985)
 Pranamam (1986)
 Ayalvasi Oru Daridravasi (1986)
 Thalavattam (1986)
 Manivathoorile Aayiram Sivarathrikal (1987)
 Anantaram (1987)
 Moonnam Pakkam (1988)
 Oru Muthassi Katha (1988)
 Mukunthetta Sumitra Vilikkunnu (1988)
 Janmandharam (1988)
 Aaryan (1988)
 Chithram (1988)
 Ramji Rao Speaking (1989)
 Oru Sayahnathinte Swapnam (1989)
 News (1989)
 Nair Saab (1989)
 Mahayanam (1989)
 Kireedam (1989)
 Dasharatham (1989)
 Vadakkunokkiyanthram (1989)
 Adarvam (1989)
 Varthamana Kalam (1990)
 Rajavazhcha (1990)
 Kadathanadan Ambadi (1990) (singer)
 Indrajaalam (1990)
 His Highness Abdullah (1990)
 Dr. Pasupathy (1990)
 Appu (1990)
 Akkare Akkare Akkare (1990)
 PavaKoothu (1990)
 In Harihar Nagar (1990)
 Oliyampukal (1990)
 Vishnulokam (1991)
 Ulladakkam (1991)
 Kuttapathram (1991)
 Kilukkampetti (1991)
 Abhimanyu
 Godfather (1991)
 Kilukkam (1991)
 Ennathe Programme (1991)
 Chanchattam (1991)
 Advaitham (1991)
 Maanthrika Cheppu (1992)
 Champakulam Thachan (1992)
 Yoddha (1992)
 Brahmadathan  (1993, unreleased)
 Gardish  (1993)
 Vietnam Colony (1993)
 Midhunam (1993)
 Devasuram (1993)
 Thenmavin Kombath (1994)
 Pingami (1994)
 Hey Hero (1994)
 Pavithram (1994)
 Kashmeeram (1994)
 Kaalapaani (1994)
 Sadaram (1995)
 Manikya Chempazhukka (1995)
 Nirnayam
 Madamma (1996)
 Aniyathipravu (1997)
 Chandralekha (1997)
 Superman (1997)
 Manthramothiram (1997)
 Lelam (1997)
 Krishnagudiyil Oru Pranayakalathu (1997)
 The Good Boys (1997)
 Gajaraja Manthram (1997)
 Ekkareyanente Manasam (1997)
 Bhoopathi (1997)
 Chandralekha (1997)
 Mayajalam (1998)
 Mangalya Pallakku (1998)
 Summer In Bethlehem (1998)
 En Swasa Kaatre (1999)
 Ezhupunna Tharakan (1999)
 Valliettan (2000)
 Dada Sahib (2000)
 Taj Mahal (2000)
 Thenkasipattanam (2000)
 Narasimham(2000)
 Vasanthiyum Lakshimiyum Pinne Njanum (2001)
 Karumadikkuttan (2001)
 Kakkakuyil (2001)
 Megasandesam (2001)
 Ee Parakkum Thalika (2001)
 Akasthile Paravakal (2001)
 Ravanaprabhu (2001)
 Videsi Nair Swadesi Nair (2002)
 Valkannadi (2002)
 Pranyamanithooval (2002)
 Mazhathullikkilukkam (2002)
 Jagathi Jagathish in Town (2002)
 Meesa Madhavan (2002)
 Kalyanaraman (2002)
 Chronic Bachelor (2003)
 Swapnam Kondu Thulabharam (2003)
 Pattalam (2003)
 Hariharan Pillai Happy Aanu (2003)
 Ammakilikkoodu (2003)
 Pattanathil Sundaran (2003)
 Chakram (2003)
 Relax (2003)
 Vamanapuram Bus Route (2004)
 Thekkekara Super Fast (2004)
 Jalolsavam (2004)
 Vettam (2004)
 Black (2004)
 Thanmathra (2005)
 Vadakkumnathan (2006)
 Prajapathi (2006)
 Kirtichakra (2006)
 Classmates (2006)
 Hallo (2007)
 Chocolate (2007)
 Bhool Bhulaiyaa (2007)
 College Kumaran (2008)
 Innathe Chintha Vishayam (2008)
 Kurukshetra (2008)
 Sagar alias Jacky Reloaded (2009)
 In Ghost House Inn (2010)
 Alexander the Great (2010)
 Oru Naal Varum (2010)
 Kandahar (2010)
 Living Together (2011)
 Chinatown (2011)
 1993 Bombay, March 12 (2011)
 Oru Marubhoomikkadha (2011)
 Ninnishtam Ennishtam 2 (2011)
 Kunjaliyan (2012)
 Simhasanam (2012)
 Husbands in Goa (2012)
 Karmayodha (2012)
 Geethaanjali (2013)
 Aamayum Muyalum (2014)
 Ottayaan (2015)
 Oppam (2016)
 1971: Beyond Borders (2017)
 Velipadinte Pusthakam (2017)
 Panchavarnathatha (2018)
 Odiyan (2018)
 Neerali (2018)
 Madhaveeyam (2019)
 Nithyaharitha Nayakan (2019)
 Pathinettam Padi (2019)
 Pattabhiraman (2019)
 Ittymaani: Made in China (2019)
 School Diary (2019)
 Big Brother (2020)
 Marakkar Arabikadalinte Simham (2021) 
 Minnal Murali(2021)
 Bro Daddy (2022) 
 Aarattu (2022) 
Tamil
"Oru Nimidam" - En Uyirinum Melana (2008)
"Pinju Thendrale" - Majunu (2001)
"En Swasa Kaatre", "Chinna Chinna Mazhaithuli" - En Swasa Kaatre (1999)
"Dandiya Aattam", "Nenacha Padi" - Kadhalar Dhinam (1999)
"Karisal Tharisal" - Taj Mahal (1999)
"Suttum Sudar" - Siraichaalai (1996)
"Nenje Gurunathrin", "Sollayo Vaai" - Mogamul (1995)
Telugu
"Dandiya", "Manasu Padi" - Premikula Roju (1999)
"Goruvakana" - Gandeevam (1992)
Hindi
"Mera Dholna" - Bhool Bhulaiyaa (2007)
"Hasta Hua" - Yeh Tera Ghar Yeh Mera Ghar (2001)
"Kissa Hum" - Doli Saja Ke Rakhna (1999)
"Saat Rang" - Saat Rang Ki Sapne (1998)
"Jiya Jale" - Dilse (1998)
"Tu Hi Tu" - Kabhi Na kabhi (1997)
"Soja Soja", "Apni Jeb" - Muskurahat (1992)

Composer
Beside films, Sreekumar has composed many devotional albums. Majority of his songs are written by Rajeev Alunkal and Gireesh Puthenchery.

Thandavam (Malayalam; 2002)
Chathurangam (Malayalam; 2002)
Kanchivaram (Tamil; 2008)
Poi Solla Porom (Tamil)
Alexander the Great (Malayalam; 2010)
Bumm Bumm Bole (Hindi; 1 song only, 2010)
Rakhupathi Raghava Rajaram (Malayalam; 2010)
Oru Naal Varum (Malayalam; 2010)
Sakudumbam Shyamala (Malayalam; 2010)
Penpattanam (Malayalam; 2010)
Sarkar Colony (Malayalam; 2010)
Arabiyum Ottakavum P. Madhavan Nairum (Malayalam; 2011)
Thamarassery to Thailand (Malayalam; 2011)
 Sneham + Ishtam = Amma (Malayalam; 2011)
 Njanum Ente Familiyum (Malayalam; 2011)
 Kunjaliyan (Malayalam; 2012)
Husbands in Goa (Malayalam; 2012)
Ardhanaari (Malayalam; 2012)
Karmayodha (Malayalam; 2012)
Good Bad & Ugly (Malayalam; 2013)
Nakshathrangal - നക്ഷത്രങ്ങൾ (Malayalam; 2014)

Television

Awards
National Film Awards:
 1990 – Best Male Playback Singer – His Highness Abdullah (Song: "Nadha Roopini") 
 1999 – Best Male Playback Singer – Vasanthiyum Lakshmiyum Pinne Njanum (Song: "Chanthu Pottum") 
Kerala State Film Awards:
 1989 – Best Male Playback Singer – Kireedam (Song: "Kanneer Poovinte") and Vadakkunokkiyantram (Song: "Mayamayooram Peeliveeshiyo")
 1991 – Best Male Playback Singer – Kilukkam (Song: "Kilukil Pambaram") and  Thudarkkadha (Song: "Aathiravaravayi")
 1992 – Best Playback Singer – Different films

Kerala Film Critics Awards
 1998 – Best Male Playback Singer — Kottaram Veettile Apputtan, Punjabi House, Summer in Bethlehem
 1999 – Best Male Playback Singer — Megham, Chandranudikkunna Dikkil, Vasanthiyum Lakshmiyum Pinne Njaanum
 2000 – Best Male Playback Singer — Kattu Vannu Vilichappol
 2001 – Best Male Playback Singer — Achaneyanenikkishtam, Praja
 2002 – Best Male Playback Singer — Nandanam
 2005 – Best Male Playback Singer — Mayookham, Balyam
 2006 – Best Male Playback Singer — Keerthi Chakra, Pothan Vava
 2011 – Best Music Director — Oru Marubhoomikkadha

Filmfare Awards South:
 2016 – Filmfare Award for Best Male Playback Singer – Malayalam – Oppam – "Chinnamma"

Asianet Film Awards:
 2003 – Best Male Playback Singer – Manassinakkare
 2005 – Best Male Playback Singer – Thanmathra, Ananthabhadram
 2008 – Best Male Playback – Innathe Chintha Vishayam
 2010 – Best Music Diaward r – Oru Naal Varum
Surya TV Awards:
 2008 – Best Playback Singer – Innathe Chintha Vishayam
 2010 – Best Playback Singer – Oru Naal Varum
Other awards:
 2008 – Raju Pilakkattu Memorial Award
 2008 – Jeevan TV – P. Jayachandran Award
 2010 – Asiavision Movie Award for Best Music Director – Oru Naal Varum
 2011 – Swaralaya Kairali Yesudas Award
 2016 – Harivarasanam Award
 2016 – Asiavision Award for Best Male Singer - Minungum Minnaminunge from the movie "Oppam"
 2016 – Mazhavil Mango Music Awards - Special Jury Award - Chinnamma from the movie "Oppam"

References

 https://timesofindia.indiatimes.com/entertainment/malayalam/music/if-i-had-tried-to-imitate-yesudas-i-would-have-reached-nowhere-m-g-sreekumar/articleshow/61981332.cms
 https://timesofindia.indiatimes.com/entertainment/malayalam/movies/singer-mg-sreekumar-to-make-his-acting-debut/articleshow/57140835.cms

External links

 
 
 MG Sreekumar's Hit Songs
 M. G. Sreekumar in MSI

Living people
Indian male playback singers
Film musicians from Kerala
Kerala State Film Award winners
Tamil playback singers
Malayalam playback singers
Malayalam film score composers
People from Alappuzha district
20th-century Indian singers
21st-century Indian singers
Best Male Playback Singer National Film Award winners
Singers from Kerala
Male film score composers
20th-century Indian male singers
21st-century Indian male singers
1957 births